The men's 4 × 400 metres relay event at the 1974 British Commonwealth Games was held on 2 February at the Queen Elizabeth II Park in Christchurch, New Zealand.

Results

References

Athletics at the 1974 British Commonwealth Games
1974